The 2012 Telus Cup was Canada's 34th annual national midget 'AAA' hockey championship played April 23–29, 2012 at Leduc, Alberta.  The Red Deer Optimist Rebels completed an improbable comeback in the gold medal game, scoring four unanswered goals in the third period en route to 6-5 double overtime win over the Phénix du Collège Esther-Blondin.  It was Red Deer's first gold medal after three previous silver medal finishes.

Teams

Round robin

Standings

Scores

Monday, April 23
Saskatoon 2 - Red Deer 2
Collège Esther-Blondin 6 - Sudbury 2
Leduc 5 - Moncton 4

Tuesday, April 24
Collège Esther-Blondin 6 - Saskatoon 2
Red Deer 2 - Moncton 1
Leduc 6 - Sudbury 3

Wednesday, April 25
Collège Esther-Blondin 9 - Moncton 5
Saskatoon 9 - Sudbury 1
Red Deer 3 - Leduc 2

Thursday, April 26
Moncton 3 - Sudbury 2
Collège Esther-Blondin 2 - Red Deer 2
Saskatoon 7 - Leduc 5

Friday, April 27
Red Deer 10 - Sudbury 3
Moncton 4 - Saskatoon 4
Collège Esther-Blondin 5 - Leduc 4

Playoffs

Semi-finals
Saturday, April 28
Red Deer 2 - Saskatoon 0
Collège Esther-Blondin 8 - Leduc 2

Bronze medal game
Sunday, April 29
Saskatoon 3 - Leduc 2

Gold medal game
Sunday, April 29, 2012
Red Deer 6 - Collège Esther-Blondin 5 (2OT)

Individual awards
Most Valuable Player: Laurent Dauphin (Collège Esther-Blondin)
Top Scorer: Laurent Dauphin (Collège Esther-Blondin)
Top Forward: Daniel Audette (Collège Esther-Blondin)
Top Defenceman: Joel Topping (Red Deer)
Top Goaltender: Dasan Sydora (Red Deer)
Most Sportsmanlike Player: Kord Pankewicz (Leduc)
Esso Scholarship: Bryn MacNab (Saskatoon)

Road to the Telus Cup

Atlantic Region
Tournament held March 29-April 1, 2012 at Jack Byrne Arena in Torbay, Newfoundland and Labrador

Championship Game
Moncton 5 - St. John's 1
Moncton advances to Telus Cup

Quebec
Ligue de Hockey Midget AAA du Quebec Championship held March 23 - April 14, 2012 at Multi Glace De Lachenaie and PEPS in Quebec

Collège Esther-Blondin wins the series 4-1 and advances to Telus Cup

Central Region
Tournament held April 2 – 8, 2012 at the Essar Centre in Sault Ste. Marie, Ontario

Semi-finals
London 3 - Missisauga 2
Sudbury 5 - Whitby 2

Championship Game
Sudbury 4 - London 3
Sudbury advances to Telus Cup

West Region
Tournament held March 29 - April 1, 2012 at the Virden Arena in Virden, Manitoba

Championship Game
Saskatoon 5 - Southwest 1

Saskatoon advances to Telus Cup

Pacific Region
Playoff held April 6–8, 2012 at Red Deer Arena in Red Deer, Alberta.

Red Deer wins series 2-0 and advances to Telus Cup

See also
Telus Cup

References

External links
2012 Telus Cup Home Page
Road to the Telus Cup
Midget AAA Telus Cup Regional Championship Website
Hockey Canada-Telus Cup Guide and Record Book

Telus Cup
Telus Cup
Leduc, Alberta
Telus Cup
Telus Cup
Ice hockey competitions in Alberta